Turkey sent 15 athletes, among them 8 women, to the 2006 European Athletics Championships held between August 7 and August 13, 2006 in Gothenburg, Sweden. The only medal winner was Elvan Abeylegesse who won a bronze medal.

Results

List of Turkey's all results, including the performances in qualifications, quarter-finals and semi-finals.

R1: Round 1, Q: Qualification, SF: Semi-final, F: Final 
DNF: Did not finish, PB: Personal best, SB: Seasonal best

Competitors

Men
100 m: İsmail Aslan
800 m: Selahattin Çobanoğlu
5,000 m: Halil Akkaş
400 m Hurdles: Tuncay Örs
20 km Walk: Recep Çelik
Hammer Throw: Eşref Apak, Fatih Eryıldırım

Women
100 m: Esen Kızıldağ, Saliha Özyurt
5,000 m: Elvan Abeylegesse
10,000 m: Elvan Abeylegesse
100 m Hurdles: Esen Kızıldağ, Nevin Yanıt
400 m Hurdles: Özge Gürler
4 × 100 m Relay: Gülay Kırşan Kılıç, Saliha Memiş Özyurt, Esen Kızıldağ, Nevin Yanıt
3,000 m Steeplechase: Türkan Erişmiş
Shot Put: Filiz Kadoğan

References
 Participants 
  Results

Nations at the 2006 European Athletics Championships
European Athletics Championships
2006